The Katharinenhof in Kranenburg, North Rhine-Westphalia, Germany, was used from 1446 until 1802 as the home of a convent of sisters of the Catholic Church. After that time, the building served various uses. Since 1961, the house serves as a museum.

History

Convent of Sisters 

It was in 1445 that Henrik Housteen, who then was the chef of the kitchen of the duke of Kleve, donated to the nuns the house in the millstreet (Mühlenstraße) in Kranenburg, so that they could found a subsidiary of their convent there. In 1446 the convent moved with the approval of the duke to that house. In 1472 the sisters adopted the Rule of St. Augustine. In 1802 the  Katharinen-convent was secularized.

Usage of the building after 1802 

After the convent was closed, the monastery-building served temporarily as a police office and finally was furbished up to be used as a school-building. During the  Drittes Reich it was the accommodation of the NSV-kindergarten.

NSV stands for  Nationalistische Volkswohlfahrt. After the  Second World War the building, which was only shopworn, was used as a compensatory church. In 1959/1960 the premises were thoroughly renovated. Since 1961 it is the home of the Museum Katharinenhof. Owner of the museum is the Verein Für Heimatschutz 1922 e. V., Kranenburg. In 1984 the building got an outbuilding, which allows for a larger exhibition space of the museum.

Further reading

External links 
 Museum Katharinenhof

Augustinian monasteries in Germany
Monasteries in North Rhine-Westphalia
Buildings and structures in Kleve (district)